Gasparone is a 1937 German musical comedy film directed by Georg Jacoby and starring Marika Rökk, Johannes Heesters and . It is based on the operetta Gasparone by Carl Millöcker with a libretto by F Zell and Richard Genée.

The film's sets were designed by the art director Erich Kettelhut. It was shot at the Babelsberg Studios and on location in Croatia.

Cast
Marika Rökk as Ita
Johannes Heesters as Erminio Bondo
 as Sindulfo
 as Carlotta
Oskar Sima as Massaccio
Leo Slezak as Nasoni
Rudolf Platte as Benozzo
Elsa Wagner as Zenobia
Ursula Herking as Sora
Arnim Suessenguth as Jucundus
Ernst Behmer as Sokrates
Erwin Biegel as man with white clove
Erich Kestin as adjutant to the Police Prefect
Paul Schwed as police captain

References

Bibliography

External links

1937 musical comedy films
German musical comedy films
Films of Nazi Germany
Films directed by Georg Jacoby
Operetta films
Films based on operettas
Films set in Europe
UFA GmbH films
Films shot at Babelsberg Studios
German black-and-white films
1930s German films